The 1999–2000 Oklahoma Sooners men's basketball team represented the University of Oklahoma in competitive college basketball during the 1999–2000 NCAA Division I men's basketball season. The Oklahoma Sooners men's basketball team played its home games in the Lloyd Noble Center and was a member of the National Collegiate Athletic Association's Big 12 Conference.

The team posted a 27–7 overall record (12–4 Big 12). The Sooners received a bid to the 2000 NCAA tournament as No. 3 seed in the West region. After an opening round win over Winthrop, the Sooners lost to No. 6 seed Purdue, 66–62.

Roster

Schedule and results

|-
!colspan=9 style=| Non-conference regular season

|-
!colspan=9 style=| Big 12 Regular Season

|-
!colspan=9 style=| Big 12 Tournament

|-
!colspan=9 style=| NCAA Tournament

Rankings

NBA draft selections

References

Oklahoma Sooners men's basketball seasons
Oklahoma
Oklahoma